Kashima General Gymnasium is an arena in Matsue, Shimane, Japan.

References

Basketball venues in Japan
Indoor arenas in Japan
Shimane Susanoo Magic
Sports venues in Shimane Prefecture